Patterson Park is a public park in Baltimore, Maryland, in the United States.

Patterson Park may also refer to:
 Patterson Park (Fort Meade, Florida)
 Patterson Park (neighborhood), Baltimore, Maryland
 Patterson Park Avenue, a street in Baltimore
 Patterson State Park,  a Pennsylvania state park 
 Stuart Patterson Park, a park in Old North Dayton, Dayton, Ohio

See also
 J. C. Love Field at Pat Patterson Park
 Jefferson Patterson Park & Museum
 Patterson Park-Highlandtown Historic District